Admiral of the Fleet Richard Howe, 1st Earl Howe,  (8 March 1726 – 5 August 1799), was a British naval officer. After serving throughout the War of the Austrian Succession, he gained a reputation for his role in amphibious operations against the French coast as part of Britain's policy of naval descents during the Seven Years' War. He also took part, as a naval captain, in the decisive British naval victory at the Battle of Quiberon Bay in November 1759.

In North America, Howe is best known for his service during the American Revolutionary War, when he acted as a naval commander and a peace commissioner with the American rebels; he also conducted a successful relief during the Great Siege of Gibraltar in the later stages of the War.

Howe later commanded the victorious British fleet during the Glorious First of June in June 1794 during the French Revolutionary Wars.

Early career 
Howe was born in Albemarle Street, London, the second son of Emanuel Howe, 2nd Viscount Howe, who died as governor of Barbados in March 1735, and of Charlotte, a daughter of Baroness von Kielmansegg, afterwards Countess of Darlington, the half-sister of King George I.

After education at Eton College, Richard Howe entered the navy in the fourth-rate  in July 1739. He then transferred to the fourth-rate , one of the squadron sent into the south seas with Admiral George Anson in 1740. Severn sailed to Cape Horn and then, after encountering storms, returned home in Spring 1742. Howe next served in the West Indies aboard the third-rate  and was present when she was severely damaged in the unsuccessful attack on La Guaira in February 1743 during the War of the Austrian Succession. He transferred to the third-rate , flagship of Admiral Sir Charles Knowles, Commander-in-Chief in the West Indies, in March 1743 and then to the fifth-rate  in July 1743, before being promoted to midshipman on 8 October 1743 and returning to HMS Suffolk later that month. Promoted to lieutenant on 25 May 1744, he joined the bomb vessel  and then transferred to the first-rate HMS Royal George, flagship of Admiral Edward Vernon, in August 1745.

Promoted to commander on 5 November 1745, Howe was commanding officer of the sloop  in the North Sea during the Jacobite rising of 1745 and was severely wounded in the head while cooperating with a frigate in an engagement with two French privateers. Promoted to post-captain on 10 April 1746, he was given command of the sixth-rate  and took part in convoy duties off Lisbon. He transferred to the command of the fourth-rate  in Summer 1747 and sailed to the West Indies before becoming Flag Captain to Admiral Sir Charles Knowles, Commander-in-Chief, Jamaica, in the third-rate  in October 1748.

Seven Years' War

In January 1755, Howe was given command of the fourth-rate  and was sent to North America as part of a squadron commanded by Admiral Edward Boscawen: his capture of the French Alcide was the first shot fired in the Seven Years' War. He was elected member of parliament for Dartmouth in May 1757 and became commanding officer of the third-rate  in the Channel in July 1757. From then until the peace of 1763, he served in the Channel in various more or less futile expeditions against the French coast, gaining a reputation as a firm and skillful officer for his role in the series of naval descents on the French coast including the Raid on Rochefort in September 1757. Promoted to commodore, with his broad pennant in the third-rate , he took part in the Raid on St Malo in June 1758, the Battle of Saint Cast in September 1758 and the Raid on Cherbourg in August 1758. He was particularly noted for his conduct at Rochefort, where he had taken the Île-d'Aix, and was described by George Rodney as performing his duties "with such cool and steady resolution, as has most justly gained him the universal applause of army and navy".

After the death of his elder brother, killed near Ticonderoga on 6 July 1758, Howe became Viscount Howe in the Peerage of Ireland. On 20 November 1759, he led Admiral Edward Hawke's fleet at the Battle of Quiberon Bay where the British won a decisive victory, forestalling a Planned French invasion of Britain. He became Flag Captain to Rear-Admiral the Duke of York in the third-rate  in June 1762.

Howe was appointed to the Board of Admiralty led by John Montagu, 4th Earl of Sandwich as Senior Naval Lord in April 1763. He became Treasurer of the Navy in 1765 and, having been promoted to rear admiral on 18 October 1770, went on to be Commander-in-Chief, Mediterranean Fleet in November 1770. Promoted to vice admiral on 5 February 1776, he became Commander-in-Chief, North American Station later that month.

American Revolutionary War
At the beginning of the American War of Independence, Howe was known to be sympathetic to the colonists. He had known Benjamin Franklin since late 1774 and was joined in a commission with his brother, General Sir William Howe, head of the land forces, to attempt a reconciliation.

Blockade

Howe was ordered to institute a naval blockade of the American coastline, but this proved to be ineffective. Howe claimed to have too few ships to successfully accomplish this, particularly as a number had to be detached to support operations by the British Army. As a result, large amounts of covert French supplies and munitions were smuggled to America. It has been suggested that Howe's limited blockade at this point was driven by his sympathy with and desire for conciliation with the Americans. By 1778 the blockade was looking more promising, with many merchant ships being taken. Howe complained to London that while his ships were able to successfully guard the southern colonies, the blockade of the northern colonies was still ineffective.

New York and Philadelphia
The strategy of the British in North America was to deploy a combination of operations aimed at capturing major cities and a blockade of the coast. The British took Long Island in August 1776 and captured New York City in September 1776 in combined operations involving the army and the navy during the New York and New Jersey campaign. He represented the Crown at the Staten Island Peace Conference held on 11 September 1776. In 1777 Howe provided support to his brother's operation to capture Philadelphia, ferrying General Howe's army to a landing point from which they successfully marched and took the city. Howe spent much of the remainder of the year concentrating on capturing Forts Mifflin and Mercer which controlled entry to the Delaware River without which ships could not reach Philadelphia. News of the capture of a separate British army under General John Burgoyne threw British plans into disarray. Howe spent the winter in Newport, Rhode Island.

Return to England

In Summer 1778 a French squadron commanded by the Comte d'Estaing was sent to America. Howe's fleet was delayed departing New York by contrary winds, and he arrived off Point Judith on 9 August. Since d'Estaing's fleet outnumbered Howe's, the French admiral, fearful that Howe would be further reinforced and eventually gain a numerical advantage, reboarded the French troops, and sailed out to do battle with Howe on 10 August. As the two fleets prepared to battle and manoeuvred for position, the weather deteriorated, and a major storm broke out.  Raging for two days, the storm scattered both fleets, severely damaging the French flagship. As the two fleets sought to regroup, individual ships encountered enemy ships, and there were several minor naval skirmishes; two French ships (including d'Estaing's flagship), already suffering storm damage, were badly mauled in these encounters. The French fleet regrouped off Delaware, and returned to Newport on 20 August, while the British fleet regrouped at New York.

Three of Howe's ships, the sixth-rate , the converted merchantman  and the row galley HMS Spitfire Galley, bombarded the American troops during the Battle of Rhode Island on 29 August. Howe then chased the remaining ships of the French fleet to Boston in Massachusetts where they made repairs. With no prospect of the French fleet coming out of port, Howe left his station in September 1778.

Declining to serve afterwards, Howe cited distrust of Lord North and a lack of support during his command in America. He was further embittered by the replacement of himself and his brother as peace commissioners, as well as by attacks in the press against him by ministerial writers including the prominent American Loyalist Joseph Galloway. An inquiry in Parliament demanded by the Howe brothers to justify their conduct in America was held during 1779 but ended inconclusively. Howe spent much of the next three years with the opposition attacking the government's alleged mismanagement of the war at sea. The only exception was his support of a motion of thanks to Admiral George Rodney for his victory against the Spanish during the Moonlight Battle.

As Howe had joined the opposition in Parliament to North's government, it was clear that until it was replaced he would be unable to secure a fresh naval command. Despite the setback at Saratoga, and the entry of France, Spain and the Dutch Republic into the war, North's government continued to gain strength until October 1781 when a British army under Lord Cornwallis was forced to surrender to a combined Franco-American force at Yorktown. Although the government was able to continue for several more months its effective power had been sapped. In March 1782 the House of Commons passed a motion ending offensive actions against the American rebels, although the war around the rest of the globe continued with the same intensity. North's government then fell and was replaced by a weak coalition of Whigs led by the Marquess of Rockingham.

Command of the Channel Fleet

Not until the fall of Lord North's government in March 1782 did Howe once again accept a command. Despite the suspension of hostilities in America, the war in Europe continued with the same force and the Royal Navy was severely stretched in having to deal with the French, Spanish and Dutch fleets. Howe received instructions from Augustus Keppel, the new First Lord of the Admiralty to proceed to Portsmouth and take command of the Channel Fleet which he did in April 1782. Promoted to full admiral on 8 April 1782, he was created Viscount Howe in the Peerage of Great Britain on 20 April 1782.

Howe's task was complex. He had to protect inbound trade convoys from the Americas, keep track of the Franco-Spanish fleet, while also keeping an eye on the Dutch fleet at port in the Texel but reportedly ready to sail. He also had to keep in mind the need to attempt a relief of Gibraltar which had been under siege for several years and would be forced to surrender if it wasn't resupplied soon. Howe had to accomplish these tasks with significantly fewer ships than his combined opponents. Keppel observed the Royal Navy's best hope was to quickly shift their limited forces from one area of danger to another.

In May Howe took a number of ships to the Dutch coast to scout out Dutch preparations. If the Dutch made a sortie into the North Sea they would be able to threaten Britain's vital Baltic convoys, including precious naval stores which were needed for continuing the war. This in turn might lead the Dutch to launch attacks on the East coast of England. As the Dutch fleet appeared unlikely to immediately put to sea, Howe returned to Britain leaving a squadron of nine ships to keep a watch on the Texel. The French and Spanish fleets had sailed from Brest and Cádiz and combined in the Western Approaches, where they managed to capture some merchant ships. Howe put to sea to try and monitor them, and received information that a major trade convoy was incoming from the West Indies.

Howe had only 25 ships-of-the-line against 36 enemy ships under Admiral Córdoba and was separated by them from the convoy he was ordered to protect. He sent a message for the convoy to put into safety in ports in Ireland. Howe then took his fleet through a dangerous route, around the north side of the Isles of Scilly. This allowed him to get between the inbound convoy and the Franco-Spanish fleet as well as allowing him to gain the weather gauge which would be a major advantage in any battle. The next morning the Franco-Spanish fleet had disappeared. After waiting a while Howe decided to go in pursuit of them, later receiving news that the West Indian convoy had safely reached harbour in the English Channel. The Franco-Spanish fleet had been blown southwards by a strong gale, and then received orders in early August to return home.

Relief of Gibraltar

In September 1782, Howe carried out the relief of Gibraltar – a difficult operation, 46 French and Spanish ships-of-the-line against only 33 of his own. The exhausted state of the fleet made it impossible for Howe to fit his ships properly or supply them with good crews, and Howe's progress to Gibraltar was hampered by the need to escort a large convoy carrying stores. Howe successfully relieved Gibraltar and then fought an indecisive action at the Battle of Cape Spartel in October 1782 after which he was able to bring his fleet safely back to Britain, bringing an effective end to the naval campaign.

First Lord of the Admiralty
Howe became First Lord of the Admiralty in January 1783 during the Earl of Shelburne's ministry, resigning in April 1783 when the Duke of Portland came to power and being re-appointed in December 1783 under the Younger Pitt's first ministry. The task was often difficult, for he had to agree to extreme budgetary constraints and disappoint the hopes of many officers who were left unemployed by the peace. Nonetheless, during his time in office a number of new ships were built as part of a naval arms race with France and Spain. During his time at the Admiralty, Howe oversaw a number of innovations to signalling. Howe felt constantly undermined by Charles Middleton, the Comptroller of the Navy. Pitt often completely bypassed Howe on naval decisions and went directly to Middleton. By 1788 Howe grew tired of this and he resigned his post as First Lord despite efforts to persuade him to stay. To show their goodwill and approval of him, the government awarded Howe an Earldom on 22 July 1788.

Spanish Armament

In 1790 a dispute by Britain and Spain over the Nootka Sound on the Pacific coast of North America threatened to spark a war between the two states. Howe, as one of the most senior and experienced officers still serving, was offered command of the fleet in May 1790 and took up his post in Portsmouth in July 1790. Consisting of 35 ships-of-the-line the Channel Fleet put to sea and cruised for around a month to the west of Ushant before returning to port. The crisis was then settled peacefully by diplomats and Howe was able to return to his retirement on land. During a similar crisis with Russia in 1791 known as the Russian Armament Howe was not offered any command, probably because he was suffering from ill health.

French Revolutionary Wars

Following the outbreak of the French Revolutionary Wars, Howe was again given command of the Channel Fleet in 1793. In command of a British fleet of twenty-two ships he defeated a fleet of twenty-five French ships, which had been escorting a grain convoy, capturing seven of the enemy ships, at the Glorious First of June in June 1794. For this victory he received the large Naval Gold Medal and chain. He was promoted to Admiral of the Fleet on 12 March 1796.

Later career
In May 1797, Howe was called on to pacify Spithead mutineers: he spent twelve hours being rowed round the fleet and speaking to the men following which peace was restored. For this he was appointed a Knight of the Order of the Garter on 2 June 1797. Howe died at his home at 11 Grafton Street in London on 5 August 1799 and was buried in his family vault at St Andrew's Church, Langar in Nottinghamshire. His monument by John Flaxman is in the south aisle at St Paul's Cathedral.

Places named after Howe include:
Cape Howe, on the New South Wales / Victoria border, Australia;
Torbay Head (the southernmost point of Western Australia), Torbay Inlet and Torbay, Western Australia, named after Lord Torbay (Lord Howe);
 West Cape Howe, near Torbay, Western Australia;
 Richard Island, in Torbay, Western Australia;
Lord Howe Island, off the east coast of Australia;
Howe Sound, British Columbia, Canada; and
Howe Street, in Vancouver, British Columbia.

Family
On 10 March 1758 Howe married Mary Hartop; they had three daughters. His titles of Viscount and Earl Howe therefore became extinct with a lack of a male heir. His eldest daughter Sophia Howe became Baroness Howe in her own right: she married twice, firstly to The Hon. Penn Assheton Curzon, son of Assheton Curzon, 1st Viscount Curzon, and his first wife Esther Hanmer, and secondly, in 1812, to Sir Jonathan Waller. She died on 3 December 1835 aged 73, and is buried in Holy Trinity Church, Penn, Buckinghamshire. Sophia's eldest surviving son, Richard, was created Earl Howe in 1821.

References

Sources

Further reading

External links

 Endnotes:
 Barrow, Sir John (1838). Life of Richard, Earl Howe, London.
 Lady Bourchier (ed. 1873). Memoir of the Life of Admiral Sir Edward Codrington. London.
 Laughton, J. K. (1899). From Howard to Nelson. London.
 Chevalier, E. (1900). Histoire de la marine française. Paris.

First Sea Lords and Chiefs of the Naval Staff
Lords of the Admiralty
Royal Navy admirals of the fleet
Royal Navy personnel of the War of the Austrian Succession
Royal Navy personnel of the Seven Years' War
Royal Navy personnel of the American Revolutionary War
Royal Navy personnel of the French Revolutionary Wars
Knights of the Garter
Earls in the Peerage of Great Britain
Peers of Great Britain created by George III
People educated at Westminster School, London
1726 births
1799 deaths
Richard
Members of the Parliament of the United Kingdom for Dartmouth
British MPs 1754–1761
British MPs 1761–1768
British MPs 1768–1774
British MPs 1774–1780
British MPs 1780–1784
Younger sons of viscounts